Kam-e Sefid-e Sofla (also Romanized as Kam-e Sefīd-e Soflá; also known as Kamsefīd) is a village in Jowzam Rural District, Dehaj District, Shahr-e Babak County, Kerman Province, Iran. At the 2006 census, its population was 148, in 43 families.

References 

Populated places in Shahr-e Babak County